The Saket Metro Station is located on the Yellow Line of the Delhi Metro. It is the last underground station on the southern end of the Yellow Line of Delhi Metro.

Situated on Mehrauli-Badarpur Road, in Saidad ul Ajaib near Saket, it serves the southern parts of Saket, including Golf Green, while the Malviya Nagar station is closer to some houses in blocks A, B, C, D and G.  
There are entrances in Block D and near the Garden of Five Senses.

Station layout

Facilities
List of available ATM at Saket metro station are HDFC Bank, Yes Bank, SBI

Entry/exit

Connections

Bus
Delhi Transport Corporation bus routes number 34, 34A, 427, 463, 525STL, 717, 717A, 717B, Badarpur Border Terminal – Gurugram Bus Stand, serves the station from nearby Saidulajab bus stop.

See also 
New Delhi
Saket (Delhi)
List of Delhi Metro stations
Transport in Delhi
Delhi Metro Rail Corporation
Delhi Suburban Railway
Delhi Transport Corporation
South Delhi
National Capital Region (India)
List of rapid transit systems
List of metro systems

References

External links

 Delhi Metro Rail Corporation Ltd. (Official site) 
 Delhi Metro Annual Reports
 

Delhi Metro stations
Railway stations opened in 2010
Railway stations in South Delhi district
2010 establishments in Delhi